The Absence is the third studio album by American singer and songwriter Melody Gardot. It was released on May 29, 2012, by Decca Records and produced by Heitor Pereira. The same year, Gardot participated in an advertisement campaign for Piaget for which she recorded the song "La Vie en rose". This song appeared on a re-release of The Absence which also included a music video and the making of the same track.

Critical reception
Ceiri O'Douglas of musicOMH mentioned, "It’s important for some artists to be as diverse as possible. Melody Gardot‘s music primarily takes influence from jazz and blues, but she’s always taken in other styles of music. On her third album, The Absence, it’s a case of more of the same. She’s travelled a lot in support of her music (mostly thanks to her 2009 breakthrough, My One And Only Thrill), and it makes sense that other cultures should have inspired the creation of its follow-up." Cormak Larkin of The Irish Times stated, "The persistent absence of clothing in her publicity photographs may suggest a flagging career but, in fact, New Jersey-born singer Melody Gardot doesn’t need to abandon her dignity to get our attention. The songs, which she writes herself, are refreshingly authentic – bittersweet laments for discarded lovers and misplaced innocence – and she sings them in a honeyed, breathy voice that has real musicality and an emotional directness that recalls Edith Piaf."

Matt Collar writing for AllMusic added, "If Melody Gardot's 2009 sophomore effort, My One and Only Thrill, sustained the sultry, atmospheric vibe of her critically acclaimed 2006 debut, her 2012 follow-up, The Absence, is a bit of a creative departure for the vocalist. Apparently inspired by her world travels, and specifically by a trip that brought her to the desert around the city of Marrakech, the album moves her away from smoky, small-group jazz and into a bright, if still bedroom-eyed, rhythmically exotic sound." Tony Nielsen of The New Zealand Herald added, "The music is mostly soft and beguiling, less in-your-face than her last album. The feel and overall direction of The Absence is easy to listen to without being bland."

Commercial reception
A four-song EP, The Absence EP, was first released as an iTunes exclusive on May 15, 2012, serving as a preview for the album. The EP debuted on the Top Jazz Albums at number eight.

The album itself was released two weeks later on May 29, 2012. It debuted at number one on Billboard's Top Jazz Albums, and at number 33 on Billboard 200, selling 10,000 copies in its first week. The album had sold 51,000 copies in the US as of May 2015. The album was certified platinum in France on November 14, 2012, signifying 100,000 copies sold.

Track listing

Charts

Weekly charts

Year-end charts

Certifications

References

External links

2012 albums
Bossa nova albums
Decca Records albums
Melody Gardot albums